Brown waste is any biodegradable waste that is predominantly carbon based. The term includes such items as grass cuttings, dry leaves, twigs, hay, paper, sawdust, corn cobs, cardboard, pine needles or cones, etc.
Carbon is necessary for composting, which uses a combination of green waste and brown waste to promote the microbial processes involved in the decomposition process. The composting of brown waste sustainably returns the carbon to the carbon cycle.

Brown waste is considered the most environmentally way to dispose of it in the ECO system. Some companies use this waste to make artificial wood, and other products used for non-food grade materials.

See also
 Biomass
 Waste management
 Composting

References 

Biodegradable waste management
Composting